Leo Torres (born January 22, 2004) is an American professional soccer player who plays as an attacking midfielder for MLS Next Pro club Austin FC II.

Career

San Antonio FC
On February 14, 2019, Torres signed his first professional contract with San Antonio FC. Aged 15 years  and 23 days, Torres was the youngest player to ever sign a contract in the USL Championship. He made his league debut for the club on August 20, 2020 in a 4–0 away victory over OKC Energy.

On September 29, 2021, Torres moved on loan to USL Championship side Real Monarchs.

References

External links
 
 

2004 births
Living people
American sportspeople of Mexican descent
American soccer players
Soccer players from Texas
People from Devine, Texas
Association football midfielders
MLS Next Pro players
San Antonio FC players
Real Monarchs players
USL Championship players
United States men's youth international soccer players